Feathers in the Wind (Italian: Piume al vento) is a 1950 Italian drama film directed by Ugo Amadoro and starring Leonardo Cortese, Olga Gorgoni and Mario Ferrari.

The film's sets were designed by Vittorio Valentini.

Cast
 Leonardo Cortese as Stefano  
 Olga Gorgoni as Marta Flores  
 Mario Ferrari as Frassoni 
 Dante Maggio as Gennaro  
 Peter Trent as cap. Von Toeplitz  
 Silvio Bagolini
 Diego Pozzetto 
 Renato Malavasi 
 Nico Pepe
 Enzo Cerusico as Little patriot  
 Giorgio Costantini 
 Viviane Vallé 
 Cristina Velvet as Anna Frassoni

References

Bibliography
 Giulio Martini. I luoghi del cinema. Touring Club Italiano, 2005.

External links
 

1950 films
1950 drama films
Italian drama films
1950s Italian-language films
Italian black-and-white films
1950s Italian films